Baungon, officially the Municipality of Baungon (Bukid and Higaonon: Banuwa ta Baungon;), is a 2nd class municipality in the province of Bukidnon, Philippines. According to the 2020 census, it has a population of 37,111 people.

History
Baungon was converted from a municipal district to a municipality through Executive Order No. 272 signed by President Carlos P. Garcia on October 4, 1957; the conversion took effect on July 1, 1956.

Tribal History

1757 - Apo Mandapagun arrived from Lambaguhon, Kagayha-an (Cagayan de Oro City today) and resided in Buenavista.  Apo Mandapagun's brothers and sisters came along with him, they were: Inay Quirenaw, Apo Man-utok, Apo Malughod and Inay Linda Dialangan.

Apo Mandapagun is the father of Apo Dapagun.  Apo Dapagun is the father of Apo Matulis.  Apo Matulis' children are:

  1. Apo Tolis
  2. Apo Amay Tomas Lilangan
  3. Apo Mandintuhan
  4. Apo Ilumon
  5. Inay Botis
  6. Inay Miayana
  7. Inay Musal
  8. Apo Sungkayaw
  9. Inay Laum
 10. Apo Mateo Hukmayan 

1902 - Old Imbatug was founded. 

1918 - an epidemic swept many lives in Old Imbatug

Due to this epidemic, the residents decided to cross back Cagayan river, some hid in the mountains.  Those who decided to stay chose Apo Manlibanda as their leader. He called a meeting and proposed that they leave old Imbatug and transfer to Brgy. Imbatug which eventually became the Poblacion.

On their way to Brgy. Imbatug, they stopped at a stream "Pandaug" (Pandahug today) and performed Panlitub - a ritual to drive away the evil spirits symbolizing the epidemic.  "Daug" is Victory thus, Pandaug is named to commemorate their victory over the sickness.  The land adjacent to the river they named "Mando".  "Mando" is “TO COMMAND" from the Latin word, "Mandatum".  This symbolized their command over the evil spirits to leave them in peace. 

In those days, there were two Mando: Upper and Lower. Mansumina Lilo lived in lower Mando, the part across the mando river near the cemetery now.  Upper Mando was the place under the direction of Apo Simbo. The chapel standing now in Mando was constructed by Apo Simbo.

May 6, 1920 - New Poblacion, Imbatug at present is founded

Apo Amay Tomas Lilangan became the first Datu that ruled the New Poblacion.  His offspring are:

 1. Rosita Lilangan Malinawon (Inay Damit)
  2. Maria Lilangan (Inay Bawi was married first to Amay Malaque of Talakag, but Apo Amay Tomas was not happy with the marriage “GI-BAWI SIYA” thus, she came to be known as Inay Bawi. The second husband of Inay Bawi was Marcos Layawan.)
  3. Cipriano Lilangan (Apo Simbo)
  4. Juliana Lilangan Oblad (Inay Ombad)

1940's the Jesuits came to do Missionary work in Baungon. Apo Simbo (CIPRIANO I) built a Chapel in Mando. It was said that in a dream, Apo Simbo saw an old woman emerged out of the river (Mando). This old woman identified herself as Fatima instructed Apo Simbo to construct a Chapel and to prepare his family to receive baptism from the Catholic missionaries that would come. The next day, the missionaries arrived and Apo Simbo had his children baptized to Christian faith.

Many members of the tribe converted to Christianity.  Soon, the Jesuit missionaries would start a Parish in Baungon. Since he had three wives, the Jesuits advised him to select only one in conformity with the Christian tradition of monogamy.  He chose the second, Inay Apay Laque.  Inay Apay had four children from Apo Simbo.  These are:

  1. Rufino Laque Lilangan who married Natividad Pabillaran
  2. Felomina Laque Lilangan married Timoteo Bacarro
  3. Leonora (Odeng) Laque Lilangan married Castor Cadete
  4. Petronila Laque Lilangan married Alfonso Jaranilla

Rufino Laque Lilangan and Natividad Pabillaran children are:

 1. Norma Pabillaran Lilangan
 2. Dulcenia Pabillaran Lilangan married Olympio Rapirap
 3. Agustin Pabillaran Lilangan married Belen Cabenta and upon the Death of the first wife married Charito Tenestrante 
 4. Roqueza Pabillaran Lilangan married Julius Sumile, Sr.
 5. Mercy Pabillaran Lilangan married Cocoy Rapirap
 6. Clotilda Pabillaran Lilangan married Eleuterio Mesiona
 7. Emerita Pabillaran Lilangan

Felomina Laque Lilangan and Timoteo Bacarro children are:

 1. Evina who married Apolinario Bacarro
 2. Irving Lilangan Bacarro married Victoria Balinas
 3. Vilma Lilangan Bacarro who married Nemesio Sinayran
 4. Nyoyen Lilangan Bacarro married Navarro
 5. Arceli Lilangan Bacarro
 6. Henedina Lilangan Bacarro married Rudolfo Amoguis
 7. Phoebe Lilangan Bacarro married Rolly Libanta
 8. Concepcion Lilangan Bacarro married Juny Buna
 9. Glory Lilangan Bacarro who married Embate
 10. Godie Lilangan Bacarro 
 11. The twin Reymar and Ramir
 12. Mardy Lilangan Bacarro who married Erwel Asuncion 

Leonora (Odeng) Laque Lilangan and Castor Cadete Sr. children are:

 1. Pedro (Boy) Lilangan Cadete married to Linda Pastolero 
 2. Manuel (Nonoy) Lilangan Cadete married Elena Magbanua
 3. Violeta (Tita) Lilangan Cadete married Roger Saludades
 4. Ma. Fe (Chari) Lilangan Cadete married Johnny Juanito
 5. Mansueto (Botoy) Lilangan Cadete
 6. Castor Lilangan Cadete Jr. married Jing Garcia
 7. Mary Cheryl (Pinky) Lilangan Cadete married to Andy Alday 

Petronila Laque Lilangan and Alfonso Jaranilla children are:

 1. Wildon Lilangan Jaranilla married Girlie Gamay
 2. Leticia Lilangan Jaranilla married Villanueva
 3. Teresita Lilangan Jaranilla married Anecito Capin
 4. Rosemarie Lilangan Jaranilla married Raul Molinas
 5. Adjutor Lilangan Jaranilla married Myrna Aranggo
 6. Jimmy Lilangan Jaranilla married Minda
 7. Milagros Lilangan Jaranilla married Dante Mabaylan
 8. Joseph Lilangan Jaranilla
 9. Rafael Lilangan Jaranilla married Merlene Dacan
 10. Michael Lilangan Jaranilla
 11. Roger Lilangan Jaranilla 
 12. Andrew Lilangan Jaranilla
 13. Lucia Lilangan Jaranilla

(Important Note: Apo Simbo also adopted the son of his sister Inay Bawi.  Adopted was his niece, Patricio Layawan, which later on kept the maiden name of his mother, thus he became known as Patricio Lilangan.)

Patricio Lilangan married Esperanza Nagac.  Their children are:

   1. Erma Nagac Lilangan married Hermetanio Lunaan
   2. Erwina Nagac Lilangan married Watson
   3. Ray Lilangan married Teresita Son
   4. Paz Nagac Lilangan married Felicisimo Lozano Rosaciña
   5. Alta Rita Nagac Lilangan married Rodolfo Lido Waban, Sr
   6. Gemma Nagac Lilangan married Robert Corbin
   7. Perla Nagac Lilangan married Apolinar Mangcawan Rara
   8. Necthom Nagac Lilangan married Profetieza Tulop
   9. Cipriano Nagac Lilangan II married Predeswinda Batulan Lilangan
  10. Teresita Nagac Lilangan married Rogelio Sabio Lago 

The inter-marriage from the tribe of Talakag can be presented this way:

Amay Kalinaw, a prominent family of Talakag was the father of Amay Lantungan, Amay Malaque (who became the first husband of Inay Bawi), and the third, Amay Salicobay.

Amay Malaque and Inay Bawi had a son with the name of Juanito Laque. Juanito was the father of Remedios Laque who later on married Meling Catubo.

The second husband of Inay Bawi was Marcos Layawan. Marcos Layawan had a first wife with 2 children:

 1. Eusebio Layawan
 2. A sister who married Caler

Marcos Layawan and Inay Bawi had two offspring: 

 1. Patricio Layawan (later on Lilangan). Patricio was adopted by Apo Simbo.
 2. Bernabe Layawan.

On the other hand, Amay Salicobay married Carmen Bisang and they bore a son with the name Simeon Salicobay. Simeon married Martina Man-inotao and their children are:

   1. Violeta Iway
   2. Felomina Pacana
   3. Anastacia Salicobay
   4. Sonny Boy Salicobay

Derivatives of Imbatug (Town Proper)

Imba - Why
Tuga - Gifted, Given
Tugà - to flow in steady stream

Imbatug - Why are we gifted with flowing stream?

COMMUNING WITH THE SPIRITS

Even before Christianity arrived in Baungon, the elders already commune with the Spirit World. When sickness visited them, they would consult the spirits of the earth, the air, the balete tree, the forests, the river and all elements that have to do with nature. For example, Mansumina Lilo and Apo Simbo are called when children of the tribe suffer from ailments. They would consult their spear (bangkaw) and let it identify the spirits hurt by the child who is ill. They called this process “Bala-on” (Stopping the spirits from doing further damage). This is done by stretching both arms between the spear. It is said that if they identify the spirit who is giving suffering to the child, the spear can be arm stretched from tip to tip. If the fingers will not reach the two tips of the spear then the spirits are not yet identified. When the spirits are identified, for instance, the spirit of balete tree allows itself be identified as the cause of ailment, only then will they look for herbal medicines appropriate for those hounded by the spirits and cure will come to the ailing child.

ANIMISM THE OLD WAY OF HIGAONONS

Animism ruled the land before the coming of the Christian Missionaries. Strange to say but they ascribe everything that is going on around them to the spirits that surround the people. When a child drowns, they say he/she was pulled by the spirits of the water. Spirits lurks in places not visited often by people. In fact, they say these spirits did not want to be disturbed that’s why they inflict misery to those who will disturb them.

CHRISTIANIZATION BY THE JESUITS

The first missionaries to arrive in Baungon were the Jesuits (Society of Jesus). They helped a lot in the formation of the different Barrios and Barangays. They would travel to these Barrios riding on the back of horses and by these means converted the locals to Christianity. Much has been done by the Jesuits for it was through their efforts that the formation of barrios and the Christianization of Baungon came about. They should be mentioned with the history of Baungon. The Jesuits who had been assigned to the parish were:

1958-1966 Fr Gregory Horgan
1966-67 Fr Thomas Connolly
1967-74 Fr Eduard Van Groenendael 
1974-75 Fr Jose Dacanay 
1975-77 Fr Teodoro Urrutia 
1977-1980 Fr Joseph Bittner 
1980-85 Fr Romeo Serrato 
1985-86 Fr Buddy Wee

But we need to take note that before the parish was even founded, the parish of Talakag helped in the missions. Frs. Neri, Dulalas, Martinez and Cebrero were invited to help in the sacramental work of Imbatug. Imbatug was declared a Parish on May 15, 1959.After the Jesuits, six filipino secular priests served the parish namely:

1986-89 Fr Gonzalo Pimentel 
1989-92 Fr Danilo Paciente 
1992-95 Fr Rudy Porras 
1995-2000 Fr Flordelito Nazareno 
2000-2001 Fr Cosme Almedilla 
2001-2007 Fr Diomedes Brigoli 
2007- Fr Efren Estaniel
2010 - Fr Charlo Maglunsod
2014 - Fr Joel Tuquib
2017 - Fr Neil Joy Molion 
2022 - Fr Richard Carreon

From among the local residents, we have produced 3 women religious: Srs. Wilma Olango, MCJ; Ruth Linaac, RVM; Adie Vallecera, RVM and another three religious missionaries among the men; they are: Fr. Sirenio Jaranilla, O.Carm; Fr. Ransom Rapirap, OCD; and Fr. Ritche Catubo of the Military Diocese.

(Historical Notes by Fr. Sirenio Jaranilla. Additional Historical Account by Datu Pantao [Feliciano Mayake] and Sonny Boy Salicobay.)

(Nota Bene: This historical narrative is focused on CIPRIANO LILANGAN I family tree being the FOUNDER of Imbatug and the Father of the First Mayor of Imbatug, Baungon, Bukidnon)

——-+++——-

Geography
It is bounded on the north-east by the Libona, at the south by the Lantapan, and on the west by Talakag. It has a land area of 328.34 square kilometres based on the cadastral survey made by the DENR.

Climate
Typical of the province environmental condition, Baungon belongs to the third type of climate which is relatively dry from March to April and wet from May to December.

Topography
The bigger part of Baungon is located over plateau, the terrain of which is generally flat with slowly rising mountains and some canyons with a highest slope of 30%. In some parts, however, the terrain is strongly sloping to severely eroded. It has three (3) large rivers, namely; Bobonawan in the north, Tumalaong at the south, and Kalawaig at the west. These rivers and its tributaries serve as natural drainage system.

Near the airport, one can find Kabula River, a favorite site for water rafting.

Flora
Baungon is home to two of the world's rarest flowers: Rafflesia and Amorphophallus paeoniifolius.  The Rafflesia that grows in Baungon was identified by one botanist, Ulysses Ferreras, as Rafflesia schadenbergiana, which was thought to be extinct. Such Rafflesia was last seen by the German Alex Schandenberg on Mount Apo in the year 1881, but found again in Bukidnon after 126 years. This Rafflesia is called by locals as "Kolon Busaw" and grows well in its soil.

Barangays
Baungon is politically subdivided into 16 barangays.

Demographics

Economy

The town's economy is primarily agricultural. The main agricultural products of Baungon are corn, casava, banana, camote, fruits and vegetables, bamboo crafts, and abaca products. Mill products consist of the following: corn grits, rice, and casava starch.

References

External links
 [ Philippine Standard Geographic Code]
Philippine Standard Geographic Code
Philippine Census Information

Municipalities of Bukidnon
Establishments by Philippine executive order